New Sarpy is a census-designated place (CDP) in St. Charles Parish, Louisiana, United States. The population was 1,169 at the 2020 census.

History

In 1699, Pierre Le Moyne d'Iberville and Jean-Baptiste Le Moyne de Bienville discovered an indigenous Bayagoula settlement located near the Mississippi River intersection with a tributary in present-day New Sarpy. The site was named L’Anse aux Outardes or Bustard’s Cove.

In 1722 and 1723, French, German, and newly arrived settlers from French Canada were granted lands on the east bank of the Mississippi River and moved from west bank German Coast villages to establish the first east bank settlement at L’Anse aux Outardes or Bustard’s Cove. The granting of lands on the east bank, led to the founding of the Second German Coast in 1730 and the establishment of officially having settlements on both banks of the Mississippi River.

Geography
New Sarpy is located at  (29.978937, -90.385492).

According to the United States Census Bureau, the CDP has a total area of 2.0 square miles (5.3 km), of which 1.7 square miles (4.4 km) is land and 0.3 square mile (0.9 km) (17.16%) is water.

Demographics 

As of the 2020 United States census, there were 1,169 people, 441 households, and 353 families residing in the CDP.

Education
St. Charles Parish Public School System operates public schools, including:
 New Sarpy Elementary School 
 Destrehan High School in Destrehan

Popular culture
The film Bug, directed by William Friedkin, includes scenes shot at Migliore's Grocery and Boomerang's Bar, in New Sarpy. The scenes were filmed on August 2, 2005, and the film had its US theatrical release on May 25, 2007.

Notable people
Jerico Nelson, NFL safety for the New Orleans Saints

References

Census-designated places in Louisiana
Census-designated places in St. Charles Parish, Louisiana
Census-designated places in New Orleans metropolitan area
Louisiana populated places on the Mississippi River